Brother in Every Inch is a Russian aviation coming-of-age drama film written and directed by Alexander Zolotukhin, starring Nikolay Zhuravlyov and Sergey Zhuravlyov as twin brothers who dream of becoming military pilots, but their attachment to each other prevents them. They have to make a difficult choice for the sake of their dreams.

The film was included in the Encounters program of the 72nd Berlin International Film Festival, and released in wide distribution in Russia on March 3, 2022.

Plot 
The story of the painful separation and the growing up of two twin brothers Mitya and Andrey Berezin, who study the difficult and dangerous profession of Russian military pilots. Since childhood, they have been inseparable. They rejoice and grieve together, overcome difficulties and adversities. But now the brothers understand that with their great love, care and affection they prevent each other from achieving a common dream – to conquer the sky. As a result, each of them is faced with a difficult choice, on which their fates depend.

Production 

Being a son of an air force pilot, Zolotukhin managed to get access to Russian military bases and screen real cadets and their trainings process.

Cast

References

External links 
 

2022 films
2020s Russian-language films
2020s coming-of-age drama films
Russian aviation films
Russian coming-of-age drama films
2022 drama films